Epinotia tenerana, the nut bud moth or alder tortricid, is a moth of the family Tortricidae.

Subspecies
Subspecies include:
Epinotia tenerana tenerana (Korea, Japan, Russia, western Europe, China: Jilin, Heilongjiang)
Epinotia tenerana amurensis Kuznetzov, 1968 (Russia: Amur region)
Epinotia tenerana kurilensis Kuznetzov, 1968 (Japan, Russia, China: Jilin)
Epinotia tenerana ussurica Kuznetzov, 1968 (Russian Far East)

Distribution
This species can be found in most of Europe, in the Near East and in the eastern Palearctic realm (eastern Russia, China, Korea, and Japan).

Habitat
These moths inhabit woodland, freshwater margins and damp areas.

Description
The wingspan of Epinotia tenerana ranges between 12–16 mm. These small moths are very variable in color. The basic color of the forewings is usually brown, ferruginous or reddish brown, with a light crossband in the middle and a bright area at the apex.

This species is rather similar to Ancylis mitterbacheriana.

Biology

Adults are on wing from July to September or early October in the UK. They fly from dusk onwards. During the day they usually rest on the foliage of the host plants.

There are two generations in the Netherlands, with adults on wing from May to June and in August. In Poland, adults are recorded to fly from June to August or September.

The larvae feed on Corylus avellana  and Alnus glutinosa, but also Betula and in rare cases even Quercus.

They live in the catkins of the food plant until the spring, then move into the developing leaf buds, making a hole at the base of the bud. Pupation takes place in a cocoon amongst leaves detritus.

References

External links
Lepiforum
 Naturhistoriska riksmusset 
 Hantsmoths
 Biolib

Moths described in 1775
Eucosmini
Moths of Europe